The 1964 World 600, the fifth running of the event, was a NASCAR Grand National Series event that took place on May 24, 1964, at Charlotte Motor Speedway in Concord, North Carolina.

There was a 30-mile consolation race the day before this to determine the final 14 starters. 

Bobby Keck finished 14th in that race (in a 1963 Ford) but he was unable to start the 600 and his car was withdrawn, with Pete Stewart taking the last starting position as the first alternate starter. Major Melton finished 16th in that race driving a 1963 Dodge and was the second alternate.

Background
Charlotte Motor Speedway is a motorsports complex located in Concord, North Carolina, 13 miles from Charlotte, North Carolina. The complex features a 1.5 miles (2.4 km) quad oval track that hosts NASCAR racing including the prestigious Coca-Cola 600 on Memorial Day weekend and the Sprint All-Star Race, as well as the Bank of America 500. The speedway was built in 1959 by Bruton Smith and Curtis Turner and is considered the home track for NASCAR with many race teams located in the Charlotte area. The track is owned and operated by Speedway Motorsports Inc. (SMI) with Marcus G. Smith (son of Bruton Smith) as track president.

Race report

The race covered four hundred laps of the paved oval track spanning . It took four hours, forty-six minutes, and fourteen seconds. Seven cautions slowed the race for 48 laps. The attendance was 66,311. Notable crew chiefs for this race included Bud Moore, Herman Beam, Ralph Gray, Glen Wood, Banjo Matthews and Dale Inman.

Miss Linda Vaughn was selected to be Pontiac's representative at this event; she was an adolescent during that time.

Jim Paschal defeated Richard Petty by more than four laps. Other notable drivers included: Ralph Earnhardt, Roy Tyner, Fireball Roberts, Elmo Langley, and Buddy Baker. The top two finishers were teammates at Petty Enterprises (now Richard Petty Motorsports). Jim Paschal would receive $24,785 ($ when adjusted for inflation) in prize money after becoming the only driver to finish all 400 laps of the race. Pete Stewart was rewarded with $600 ($ when adjusted for inflation) for finishing only one lap; resulting in a last place finish. Jimmy Pardue started in pole position while the winner started in 12th place.

Qualifying

Death of Fireball Roberts
Fireball Roberts was involved in a crash while trying to avoid Junior Johnson and Ned Jarrett's crash on lap 7. Roberts was sent to Charlotte hospital. While he was not seriously injured by the crash itself, Roberts was trapped when his ankle became pinned under the dashboard and caught by either the clutch or brake pedal. The death would have occurred at the speedway if Jarrett hadn't pulled Roberts out. He died on July 2 of that year; leaving behind a wife (Doris Roberts) and a young daughter (Pamela Jane Roberts Trivette). Jarrett would go up to Roberts, and Roberts, who was uninjured and conscious, told Jarrett "Oh my God, Ned, help me! I'm on fire!" after being caught on fire because of the crash.

Before the fatal accident, Roberts was going to announce his retirement from the NASCAR Cup Series after the race to work as a spokesperson for a beer company. Fireball, as he was known to his racing fans and to his fellow drivers, was the first superstar of the superspeedway era.

Doctors ultimately blamed his death on pneumonia and he spent the last 39 days of his life at Charlotte Memorial Hospital (now Carolinas Medical Center) in extremely critical condition. The entire week from May 24 through May 30, 1964, ultimately became one of the darkest weeks in motorsports history as Eddie Sachs and Dave MacDonald were both killed in that year's Indianapolis 500. Actual home video footage of the accident was being recorded as the race occurred. The race was being televised by local CBS affiliate WBTV. Roberts' body was eventually delivered to his burial crypt in Daytona Beach, Florida. One of the quotes that came in an earlier race sometime prior to his death was "I fear fire the most!"

Numerous safety innovations came about as a result of Roberts' death including the fire suit, as some drivers still raced wearing jeans and t-shirts, as well as a specialized fuel cell for racing. These inventions would first see usage at the 1964 Firecracker 400; just two days after Roberts' death.

Finishing order
Section reference:

Timeline
Section reference: 
 Start of race: Jimmy Pardue has the pole position to begin the event.
 Lap 3: Bud Harless didn't race for long before his vehicle's engine could not handle the pressure anymore.
 Lap 5: Ralph Earnhardt ruined his engine.
 Lap 6: Buddy Baker managed to overheat his vehicle.
 Lap 7: Ned Jarrett, Junior Johnson, and Fireball Roberts were jointly involved in a terminal crash.
 Lap 11: Mark Hurley managed to bust his vehicle's transmission.
 Lap 28: The ignition on Ken Rush's vehicle stopped working.
 Lap 34: Bobby Isaac took over the lead from Jimmy Pardue.
 Lap 44: Paul Goldsmith took over the lead from Bobby Isaac.
 Lap 50: Roy Mayne's vehicle had an oil leak.
 Lap 52: Marvin Panch had a terminal crash.
 Lap 60: LeeRoy Yarbrough took over the lead from Paul Goldsmith.
 Lap 67: Paul Goldsmith took over the lead from LeeRoy Yarbrough.
 Lap 70: Jimmy Pardue took over the lead from Paul Goldsmith.
 Lap 80: Paul Goldsmith took over the lead from Jimmy Pardue.
 Lap 117: Cale Yarborough had a terminal crash.
 Lap 122: LeeRoy Yarbrough took over the lead from Paul Goldsmith.
 Lap 123: David Pearson took over the lead from LeeRoy Yarbrough.
 Lap 124: Buck Baker took over the lead from David Pearson.
 Lap 137: Stick Elliott fell out with engine failure.
 Lap 148: Paul Goldsmith took over the lead from Buck Baker.
 Lap 169: The engine mount on Bobby Isaac's vehicle was giving him problems.
 Lap 189: Fred Lorenzen took over the lead from Paul Goldsmith.
 Lap 195: Jimmy Pardue fell out with engine failure.
 Lap 199: The axle on Larry Thomas' vehicle forced him out of the race.
 Lap 217: Ken Spikes' was disqualified from the race by virtue of a black flag.
 Lap 223: Paul Goldsmith took over the lead from Fred Lorenzen.
 Lap 231: Problems with the vehicle's clutch forced Bill McMahan to leave the race prematurely.
 Lap 238: Buck Baker fell out with engine failure.
 Lap 253: Paul Goldsmith fell out with engine failure.
 Lap 254: Fred Lorenzen took over the lead from Paul Goldsmith.
 Lap 255: The rear end came loose off of Bunkie Blackburn's vehicle.
 Lap 275: Jim Paschal took over the lead from Fred Lorenzen.
 Lap 344: Darel Dieringer fell out with engine failure.
 Finish: Jim Paschal was officially declared the winner of the event.

References

World 600
World 600
NASCAR races at Charlotte Motor Speedway
World 600